Evercam is a free, open-source, closed-circuit television software application designed to be run as SaaS. Evercam  originated as a proprietary VSaaS application in 2010 by Irish company Camba.tv Ltd who published the source code to the public under the Affero General Public License (AGPL) licence in April 2015. 

Uses of the software include security, supply chain monitoring, Time-lapse photography, and Enterprise Resource Planning integrations.

Evercam earns revenue by providing the Software as a Service, a business model that is increasingly common amongst open source companies.

Feature List
Over 3000 Public Domain Cameras 
Web API written in Swagger

See also

Closed-circuit television (CCTV)
Closed-circuit television camera
IP camera
Motion Open Source Surveillance Software
Zoneminder Open Source Surveillance Software

References

External links
Evercam official website

API Evangelist review
Programmable Web Review
Techcrunch discussion
Irish Independent Commentary

Surveillance
Software using the GNU AGPL license